Beautiful is the third studio album by The Reels and was released in 1982 by special licence on the budget-priced K-tel label. The album was subsequently released on CD through RCA (BPCD5038). The Reels had just split in two, following the recent shock departures of bass player Paul Abrahams and keyboardist Karen Ansell (lead keyboardist Colin Newman had previously left in mid '81), forcing remaining members David Mason, Craig Hooper and Stephan Fidock to work out other concepts; eventually, they decided to shuffle on as a trio and use a tape recorder for live work. Nonetheless, Beautiful was the Reels' most successful album to date, mainly covering Middle of the Road classics with a synthesiser feel. The single taken from it, "This Guy's in Love With You" gave the Reels their biggest hit in Australia, reaching #6 around November, 1982. The album was later certified gold. In 2012 it was remastered and reissued on Compact Disc by Liberation Music.

Track listing
Side One
"This Guy's in Love with You" (Bacharach-David) - 4:34
"Where Is the Love?" (MacDonald-Salter) - 2:03
"La Mer" (Trenet) - 3:18
"Cry" (Mason-Fidock) - 3:16
"(Last Night) I Didn't Get to Sleep at All" (Tony Macaulay) - 3:16
"Prefab Heart" (Mason) - 3:18 Note: A slow-paced & melancholy version very different from that on the first album.

Side Two
"True Love" (Porter) - 2:25
"Electric & Musical Industries Ltd." - 2:27
"Science Is Golden" (Mason) - 2:44
"He'll Have to Go" (Allison-Allison) - 2:39
"The Last Waltz" (Mason-Reed) - 3:17
"Return" (Mason-Hooper) - 4:16

Charts

References

1982 albums
The Reels albums